The 15 July 2008 Baquba bombings occurred at around 8am local time on 15 July 2008, in Baquba, Diyala Governorate, targeting army recruits at the al-Saad army camp. According to the Iraqi army, the bombers – one dressed in an Iraqi military uniform, the other in civilian clothing – mingled with the crowds of over 200 young recruits before blowing themselves up, killing 35 and injuring 63.

See also
List of terrorist incidents, 2008

References

External links 
BBC News – Bombers kill Iraq army recruits

2008 murders in Iraq
Suicide bombings in Iraq
Terrorist incidents in Iraq in 2008
Mass murder in 2008
July 2008 events in Iraq